Desmiphora jullienae is a species of beetle in the family Cerambycidae. It was described by Tavakilian and Néouze in 2004. It is known from French Guiana.

References

Desmiphora
Beetles described in 2004